What We Want, What We Get is the fourth studio album released by the singer-songwriter Dave Barnes. It was released on April 6, 2010.

Track listing
 "Little Lies" – 2:47
 "God Gave Me You" – 3:49
 "What I Need" (ft. Jonny Lang) – 4:01
 "What We Want, What We Get" – 3:40
 "Chameleon" – 3:42
 "Someone's Somebody" – 4:18
 "Look So Easy" – 3:43
 "You Do the Same For Me" – 5:20
 "My Love, My Enemy" – 4:00
 "Amen" – 4:16

Appearances in other media
The song "God Gave Me You" was used in an episode of The Suite Life on Deck called "Prom Night". It also appeared on Blake Shelton's album Red River Blue.
The song "Little lies" was used in every ending of seasons 2 and 3 of Der Lehrer (The teacher), a German comedy series.

Charts

References

CMSpin.com

External links
DaveBarnes.com
Dave Barnes on "What We Want, What We Get", CBN.com

Dave Barnes albums
2010 albums